Twilight War may refer to:

Winston Churchill's name for the Phoney War, the first phase of World War II
A fictional war in the role playing game Twilight 2000
A novel series in the Forgotten Realms setting by Paul S. Kemp
A board game produced by SPI covering the resistance war in France during World War II